EAF may refer to:

Military 
 Egyptian Air Force
 Estonian Air Force
 Ethiopian Air Force
 East Africa Forces, in the compendium of postage stamp issuers

Other uses 
 EAF family of proteins
 Earagail Arts Festival, in County Donegal, Ireland
East African Federation, the proposed successor to the East African Community
 East Asia Forum
 Electric arc furnace
 Electric arc furnace transformer 
 Enterprise architecture framework
 Ethiopian Athletic Federation
 European Aviation Air Charter, a defunct British airline
 European Alliance for Freedom, a European political party
 Experimental Art Foundation, group of artists in Adelaide, South Australia, from the 1970s, later ACE Open
 SAP Enterprise Architecture Framework